Falls River may refer to:

In the United States
Falls River (Michigan), a tributary of Lake Superior
Falls River (Connecticut River), in Massachusetts and Vermont, a tributary of the Connecticut River
Wood River (Pawcatuck River), in Connecticut and Rhode Island, known as Falls River from its source to Stepstone Falls

Elsewhere
Falls River (New Zealand), a tributary of Tasman Bay

See also
Fall River (disambiguation)
Falls Creek (disambiguation)